The Jackson Code are an Australian rock band, formed in Perth in 1989.

Biography

1989-1991: Formation 
The Jackson Code were formed in 1989, following the breakup of Mark Snarksi's earlier band, Chad's Tree. For the band's debut album, Snarski utilised the services of Amanda Pearson (vocals, percussion), Barry Turnbull (bass) and Mark Dawson (drums). The album, Del Musical Del Mismo Nombre was released in August 1989 on the Waterfront label (available only on vinyl) to critical acclaim, although it was re-released on CD in 1993. The main influence on the album was songwriter Snarski's trip to Spain, thus the title which when translated means "From the Musical of the Same Name". The band recorded the album in four days on a budget of $1000. The lush romanticism of the songs had critics searching for superlatives. Writing in Rolling Stone, reviewer Jon Casimir called the album one of the minor masterpieces of 1989. As Casimir put it, the band took inspiration for its 'self-styled urban Romantic Cabaret' from German writers such as Brecht and Weill, as well as Tom Waits. To promote the record they toured nationally twice, playing successful shows in Sydney and Melbourne. Rather than capitalise on such acclaim however, Snarski chose to take a break, spending two years travelling in Spain and the USA.

1992-1998: Ra Records
Snarski revived The Jackson Code in 1992 and recorded a new album, Strange Cargo. Snarski was joined in the recording studio by Pearson, Turnbull and Dawson, together with string, brass and 'hand-clap' sections. Strange Cargo was released on the Citadel label in August 1992. 1993 also saw the band sign to RooArt and produce one of that years (sic) finest, Draggin' the River. The album was released in December 1993. The band's last studio album was The Things You Need, which was released in September 1995. After touring with American crime writer James Ellroy in 1996, Snarski left Australia for Europe finally settling in Madrid. 'There was this one afternoon where I'd dropped everyone off and I was carting this amp up the stairs of - what's that theatre we played in St Kilda? I just put it down and decided, I've had enough of this.'

The Jackson Code's drummer Mark Dawson plays with the Blackeyed Susans (he also worked with Ed Kuepper). Kenny Davis Jr and Kathryn Wemyss also played, albeit briefly, with the Blackeyed Susans.  Wemyss later performing with Midnight Oil at the opening ceremony of the Sydney Olympics in 2000, since then she has formed her own band called Wemo. Davis went on to join Decoder Ring. Barry Turnbull and Mandy Pearson went on to form their own band, Love Me.

The Jackson Code's retrospective album of 1998, The Second Greatest Story Ever Told, a two disc compilation album (the first disc consists of tracks from the four studio albums and the second disc is full of rarities) was released in September 1998. In 2003 Del Musical Del Mismo Nombre was re-issued on a CD format by Citadel Records.

In June 2006 Snarski travelled to Belgium to sing with a specially reformed Triffids lineup for 'An Evening with the Triffids' – an exhibition and show in remembrance of lead singer David McComb.

Trivia
 The Jackson Code's "Everybody's Got Something To Lose" was included in the Australian Television series Heartbreak High (Episode 9 - Series 1).

Members
 Mark Snarski - vocals, electric & acoustic guitar
 Kathryn Wemyss - vocals, trumpet, castanets
 Mark Dawson (aka Bongo Fury) - drums
 Jason Kain - electric & acoustic guitar
 Kenny Davis Jr - piano, hammond organ, accordion
 Barry Turnbull - electric & acoustic bass
 Mandy Pearson - vocals, percussion

Discography

Studio albums

Compilation albums

Singles
 "Who's Watching Who?" - Ra (September 1993)
 "Poison Berries" - Ra (January 1993)
 "Bring Yourself Home to Me" - Ra (January 1994)
 "The Things You Need" - Ra (July 1995)

Awards and nominations

ARIA Music Awards
The ARIA Music Awards are a set of annual ceremonies presented by Australian Recording Industry Association (ARIA), which recognise excellence, innovation, and achievement across all genres of the music of Australia. They commenced in 1987. 

! 
|-
| 1993
| Strange Cargo
| rowspan="2"| ARIA Award for Best Independent Release
| 
| rowspan="2"| 
|-
| 1994
| Dragging the River
| 
|-

References

Australian indie rock groups
Western Australian musical groups
Musical groups established in 1989
Musical groups disestablished in 1996